Contarex lenses are a series of photographic camera lenses used by the Contarex camera. They use the Contarex bayonet lens mount. The lenses were first presented at Photokina in 1958 and initially scheduled for delivery in the spring of 1959, but they were not made generally available until March 1960. The series was discontinued, but there are still many lenses available in the market. Their exemplary performance has led companies to make mount adapters to fit them to modern digital cameras.

Lenses 

These are all official lenses for the Contarex system, and all are manufactured by Carl Zeiss.

References 

Photographic lenses